The Danton Case is a 1929 historical play by the Polish writer Stanisława Przybyszewska. The work portrays the conflict between the rival revolutionaries Maximilien Robespierre and Georges Danton during the French Revolution, particularly in the period leading up to Danton's execution. Przybyszewska wrote the play between March 1928 and March 1929, after many years of studying the French Revolution.

Adaptations
The 1932 French film Danton and the 1983 Polish-French film Danton both drew inspiration from the play.

Bibliography
 Braun, Kazimierz. A history of Polish theater, 1939-1989. Greenwood Publishing, 1996.
 Rokem, Freddie. Performing History: Theatrical Representations of the Past in Contemporary Theatre. University of Iowa Press, 2000

External links
Stanisława Przybyszewska: The Maddest of All Female Robespierrists

Plays by Stanisława Przybyszewska
1929 plays
Polish plays adapted into films
Plays set in the French Revolution
Plays based on real people
Works about Georges Danton
Cultural depictions of Maximilien Robespierre
Cultural depictions of Georges Danton